Hasanabad (also Romanized as Ḩasanābād) is a village in Narestan Rural District of Aqda District of Ardakan County, Yazd province, Iran. At the 2006 National Census, its population was 774 in 241 households. The following census in 2011 counted 870 people in 300 households. The latest census in 2016 showed a population of 935 people in 330 households; it was the largest village in its rural district.

References 

Ardakan County

Populated places in Yazd Province

Populated places in Ardakan County